Sedulius may refer to:

 Coelius Sedulius, Christian poet of the 5th century
 Sedulius Scottus, grammarian of the 9th century